The Treaty of Kremmen was signed on 20 June 1236 by Duke Wartislaw III of Pomerania, recognizing the seigniory of the Brandenburg margraves over his Duchy of Pomerania-Demmin, and ceding the terrae Stargard, Wustrow and Beseritz to Brandenburg.

Background
After the Danish defeat at the 1227 Battle of Bornhöved, the Griffin dukes of Pomerania had lost their allies against the rising power of their Brandenburg neighbours in the south. In 1231 Emperor Frederick II had confirmed the seigniory of the Ascanian margraves John I and Otto III of Brandenburg. At the same time the Mecklenburg dukes campaigned the Circipane lands in the west, while the eastern territory of Schlawe-Stolp was occupied by Duke Swietopelk II of Pomerelia.

To ease the tensions with Brandenburg, Duke Wartislaw entered into the Kremmen agreement. He also stipulated the escheat (reversion) of his Pomeranian lands, would he die without heirs.

References

External links
Full text of the treaty of Kremmen (Latin) in Boll, Franz: Geschichte des Landes Stargard bis zum Jahre 1471, Neustrelitz 1846 
Full text of the treaty of Kremmen (German translation) in Boll, Franz: Geschichte des Landes Stargard bis zum Jahre 1471, Neustrelitz 1846

History of Pomerania
Kremmen
Treaties of the Margraviate of Brandenburg
Treaties of the Duchy of Pomerania
1230s in the Holy Roman Empire
1236 in Europe